Jowkar (also Romanized as Jowkār and Jow Kār: also known as Jaūkāl and Jokar) is the capital city of Jowkar District, in Malayer County, Hamadan Province, Iran. During the 2006 census, its population was 2,209, in 548 families.

References

Populated places in Malayer County

Cities in Hamadan Province